Eating (also known as consuming) is the ingestion of food, typically to provide a heterotrophic organism with  energy and to allow for growth. Animals and other heterotrophs must eat in order to survive — carnivores eat other animals, herbivores eat plants, omnivores consume a mixture of both plant and animal matter, and detritivores eat detritus. Fungi digest organic matter outside their bodies as opposed to animals that digest their food inside their bodies. For humans, eating is an activity of daily living. Some individuals may limit their amount of nutritional intake. This may be a result of a lifestyle choice, due to hunger or famine, as part of a diet or as religious fasting.

Eating practices among humans

Many homes have a large kitchen area devoted to preparation of meals and food, and may have a dining room, dining hall, or another designated area for eating.

Most societies also have restaurants, food courts, and food vendors so that people may eat when away from home, when lacking time to prepare food, or as a social occasion. At their highest level of sophistication, these places become "theatrical spectacles of global cosmopolitanism and myth." At picnics, potlucks, and food festivals, eating is in fact the primary purpose of a social gathering. At many social events, food and beverages are made available to attendees.

People usually have two or three meals a day. Snacks of smaller amounts may be consumed between meals. Doctors in the UK recommend three meals a day (with between 400–600 kcal per meal), with four to six hours between. Having three well-balanced meals (described as: half of the plate with vegetables, 1/4 protein food as meat, [...] and 1/4 carbohydrates as pasta, rice) will then amount to some 1800–2000 kcal, which is the average requirement for a regular person.

In jurisdictions under Sharia law, it may be proscribed for Muslim adults during the daylight hours of Ramadan.

Development in humans

Newborn babies do not eat adult foods. They survive solely on breast milk or formula. Small amounts of pureed food are sometimes fed to young infants as young as two or three months old, but most infants do not eat adult food until they are between six and eight months old. Young babies eat pureed baby foods because they have few teeth and immature digestive systems. Between 8 and 12 months of age, the digestive system improves, and many babies begin eating finger foods. Their diet is still limited, however, because most babies lack molars or canines at this age, and often have a limited number of incisors. By 18 months, babies often have enough teeth and a sufficiently mature digestive system to eat the same foods as adults. Learning to eat is a messy process for children, and children often do not master neatness or eating etiquette until they are five or six years old.

Eating positions
Eating positions vary according to the different regions of the world, as culture influences the way people eat their meals.
For example, most of the Middle Eastern countries, eating while sitting on the floor is most common, and it is believed to be healthier than eating while sitting to a table.

Eating in a reclining position was favored by the Ancient Greeks at a celebration they called a symposium, and this custom was adopted by the Ancient Romans. Ancient Hebrews also adopted this posture for traditional celebrations of Passover.

Compulsive overeating

Compulsive overeating, or emotional eating, is "the tendency to eat in response to negative emotions". Empirical studies have indicated that anxiety leads to decreased food consumption in people with normal weight and increased food consumption in the obese.

Many laboratory studies showed that overweight individuals are more emotionally reactive and are more likely to overeat when distressed than people of normal weight. Furthermore, it was consistently found that obese individuals experience negative emotions more frequently and more intensively than do normal weight persons.

The naturalistic study by Lowe and Fisher compared the emotional reactivity and emotional eating of normal and overweight female college students. The study confirmed the tendency of obese individuals to overeat, but these findings applied only to snacks, not to meals. That means that obese individuals did not tend to eat more while having meals; rather, the amount of snacks they ate between meals was greater. One possible explanation that Lowe and Fisher suggest is obese individuals often eat their meals with others and do not eat more than average due to the reduction of distress because of the presence of other people. Another possible explanation would be that obese individuals do not eat more than the others while having meals due to social desirability. Conversely, snacks are usually eaten alone.

Hunger and satiety

There are many physiological mechanisms that control starting and stopping a meal. The control of food intake is a physiologically complex, motivated behavioral system. Hormones such as cholecystokinin, bombesin, neurotensin, anorectin, calcitonin, enterostatin, leptin and corticotropin-releasing hormone have all been shown to suppress food intake.

Initiation

There are numerous signals given off that initiate hunger. There are environmental signals, signals from the gastrointestinal system, and metabolic signals that trigger hunger. The environmental signals come from the body's senses. The feeling of hunger could be triggered by the smell and thought of food, the sight of a plate, or hearing someone talk about food. The signals from the stomach are initiated by the release of the peptide hormone ghrelin. Ghrelin is a hormone that increases appetite by signaling to the brain that a person is hungry.

Environmental signals and ghrelin are not the only signals that initiate hunger, there are other metabolic signals as well. As time passes between meals, the body starts to take nutrients from long-term reservoirs. When the glucose levels of cells drop (glucoprivation), the body starts to produce the feeling of hunger. The body also stimulates eating by detecting a drop in cellular lipid levels (lipoprivation). Both the brain and the liver monitor the levels of metabolic fuels. The brain checks for glucoprivation on its side of the blood–brain barrier (since glucose is its fuel), while the liver monitors the rest of the body for both lipoprivation and glucoprivation.

Termination
There are short-term signals of satiety that arise from the head, the stomach, the intestines, and the liver. The long-term signals of satiety come from adipose tissue. The taste and odor of food can contribute to short-term satiety, allowing the body to learn when to stop eating. The stomach contains receptors to allow us to know when we are full. The intestines also contain receptors that send satiety signals to the brain. The hormone cholecystokinin is secreted by the duodenum, and it controls the rate at which the stomach is emptied. This hormone is thought to be a satiety signal to the brain. Peptide YY 3-36 is a hormone released by the small intestine and it is also used as a satiety signal to the brain. Insulin also serves as a satiety signal to the brain. The brain detects insulin in the blood, which indicates that nutrients are being absorbed by cells and a person is getting full. Long-term satiety comes from the fat stored in adipose tissue. Adipose tissue secretes the hormone leptin, and leptin suppresses appetite. Long-term satiety signals from adipose tissue regulates short-term satiety signals.

Role of the brain
The brain stem can control food intake, because it contains neural circuits that detect hunger and satiety signals from other parts of the body. The brain stem's involvement of food intake has been researched using rats. Rats that have had the motor neurons in the brain stem disconnected from the neural circuits of the cerebral hemispheres (decerebration), are unable to approach and eat food. Instead they have to obtain their food in a liquid form. This research shows that the brain stem does in fact play a role in eating.

There are two peptides in the hypothalamus that produce hunger, melanin concentrating hormone (MCH) and orexin. MCH plays a bigger role in producing hunger. In mice, MCH stimulates feeding and a mutation causing the overproduction of MCH led to overeating and obesity. Orexin plays a greater role in controlling the relationship between eating and sleeping. Other peptides in the hypothalamus that induce eating are neuropeptide Y (NPY) and agouti-related protein (AGRP).

Satiety in the hypothalamus is stimulated by leptin. Leptin targets the receptors on the arcuate nucleus and suppresses the secretion of MCH and orexin. The arcuate nucleus also contains two more peptides that suppress hunger. The first one is cocaine- and amphetamine-regulated transcript (CART), the second is α-MSH (α-melanocyte-stimulating hormone).

Disorders

Physiologically, eating is generally triggered by hunger, but there are numerous physical and psychological conditions that can affect appetite and disrupt normal eating patterns. These include depression, food allergies, ingestion of certain chemicals, bulimia, anorexia nervosa, pituitary gland malfunction and other endocrine problems, and numerous other illnesses and eating disorders.

A chronic lack of nutritious food can cause various illnesses, and will eventually lead to starvation. When this happens in a locality on a massive scale, it is considered a famine.

If eating and drinking is not possible, as is often the case when recovering from surgery, alternatives are enteral nutrition and parenteral nutrition.

Other animals

Mammals

Birds

See also

 Aphagia
 Chewing
 Competitive eating
 Crop
 Dietary supplement
 Dieting
 Dining in, formal military ceremony
 Drinking
 Eat Me (disambiguation)
 Eat This, Not That
 Energy crop
Foodways
 Forced feeding
 Muk-bang
 Swallowing

References

External links

Health-EU Portal – Nutrition

Physiology
Food and drink
Nutrition
Human positions
 
Dining